Hanimaadhoo (Dhivehi: ހަނިމާދޫ) is one of the inhabited islands of Haa Dhaalu Atoll administrative division and geographically part of Thiladhummathi Atoll in the north of the Maldives.

Geography

Climate
The Hanomaadhoo Meteorological Observatory is located on this island. Many flight scientific research such as those investigating aerosol concentrations in the atmosphere and the Brown Cloud phenomenon have been initiated from Hanimaadhoo.

Demography
Islanders from Hathifushi and Hondaidhoo have been relocated to Hanimaadhoo in the recent years.

Economy
The island is planned to be one of the developmental centres of the newly planned Mathi-Uthuru Province.

Transport
The island is the site of Hanimaadhoo Airport, one of the few domestic airports of the Maldives.

Gallery

References

Islands of the Maldives